Pahoturi may refer to:
 Pahoturi languages, a group of languages in Papua New Guinea
 Pahoturi River, a river south of the Fly River in Papua New Guinea